The 2001 Porto Open was a women's tennis tournament played on outdoor clay courts in Porto, Portugal and was part of Tier IV of the 2001 WTA Tour. It was the inaugural edition of the tournament and was held from 2 April until 8 April 2001. First-seeded Arantxa Sánchez Vicario won the singles title and earned $22,000 first-prize money.

Finals

Singles

 Arantxa Sánchez Vicario defeated  Magüi Serna 6–3, 6–1
 It was Sánchez Vicario's 2nd title of the year and the 90th of her career.

Doubles

 María José Martínez /  Anabel Medina Garrigues defeated  Alexandra Fusai /  Rita Grande 6–1, 6–7(5–7), 7–5
 It was Martínez's 2nd title of the year and the 2nd of her career. It was Medina Garrigues' 2nd title of the year and the 2nd of her career.

External links
 ITF tournament edition details
 Tournament draws

Porto Open
Porto Open
2001 in Portuguese tennis